Wilhelm Lachnit (12 November 1899, near Dresden — 14 November 1962, Dresden) was a German painter who was primarily active in Dresden.

Life
Lachnit was born in the small town of Gittersee; his family moved to Dresden in 1906. He studied at the Kunstgewerbeschule Dresden under Richard Guhr, and later at the Dresden Academy of Fine Arts, where he was acquainted with and influenced by Otto Dix, Conrad Felixmüller, and Otto Griebel. He joined the Communist Party of Germany in 1924 and was active in producing various forms of Agitprop throughout the 1920s. He co-founded the "Neue Gruppe" with Hans Grundig, Otto Griebel, and Fritz Skade; successful exhibitions in Paris, Düsseldorf, Amsterdam, and Dresden followed.

After the Nazis seized power in 1933, Lachnit's work was declared "degenerate" and confiscated by authorities. During this period he was not allowed to make art and worked as an exhibition designer. Much of his confiscated work was destroyed during the February 1945 firebombing of Dresden. His 1923 watercolours Man and Woman in the Window and "Girl at Table" were found in the Munich Art Hoard.

Lachnit continued to paint after the end of World War II. In 1947 he was appointed professor at the Hochschule für Bildene Künste Dresden. Among his more important students were Jürgen Böttcher, Manfred Böttcher, and Harald Metzkes.

Lachnit died of a heart attack in 1962 and was buried in Loschwitzer Friedhof in Dresden.

See also
 Association of Revolutionary Visual Artists

Further reading
 Joachim Uhlitzsch: Wilhelm Lachnit. Seemann, Leipzig 1968.
 
 Friedegund Weidemann: Der Maler und Graphiker Wilhelm Lachnit: Studie zu seinem Menschenbild. Diss, Humboldt-Univ., Berlin 1983.
 Hans Joachim Neidhardt: Dresden, wie es Maler sahen. Edition Leipzig, Leipzig 1983.
 Wilhelm Lachnit. Gemälde, Graphik, Zeichnungen. Akademie der Künste der DDR, Kathleen Krenzlin, Berlin 1990. 
 Ingrid Wenzkat (ed.): Dresden - Vision einer Stadt. Hellerau-Verlag Dresden, Dresden 1995.
 Gabriele Werner: Wilhelm Lachnit, Gemälde 1899-1962; Ausstellung vom 12. Februar bis 30. April 2000 Staatliche Kunstsammlungen Dresden, Gemäldegalerie Neue Meister, Albertinum Brühlsche Terrasse. Staatliche Kunstsammlungen, Dresden 1999.
 Wulf Kirsten und Hans-Peter Lühr (ed.): Künstler in Dresden im 20. Jahrhundert. Literarische Porträts. Verlag der Kunst Dresden, Dresden 2005.

References

External links 
 
 Entry for Wilhelm Lachnit in the Union List of Artist Names
 
 
 About William Lachnit's work

1899 births
1962 deaths
20th-century German painters
20th-century German male artists
German male painters
Artists from Dresden